The Wakara or Wakura were an indigenous Australian people of the state of Queensland.

Country
The Wakara are estimated by Norman Tindale to have had a tribal domain of some 3., running along the southern flank of the upper Mitchell River, and extending eastwards as far as Mount Mulligan. To the west their frontiers lay around Wrotham Park and Blackdown.

History of contact
White contact with the Wakara began in 1875, when settlers remarked that they were a powerful tribe in the region. They also noted the presence of another group, west of Mount Mulligan, called the Wunjurika, which may have been an autonomous tribe or simply a band society of the Wakara. Within 15 years, by 1890, the Wunjurika had been so thoroughly absorbed into the Wakara tribe that they lost whatever independent identity they may have had. Though numerous at the initial stage of contact, the Goldfields Commissioner on the Hodgkinson diggings, H. M. Mowbray, wrote that within the decade, they had been "much reduced by its frequent encounters with the Native Police and the settlers, as well as by diseases introduced by the Whites." Syphilis, also spread by contact with whites, further ravaged the tribe.

Alternative names
 Koko-wogura
 Kookoowarra (according to R. H. Mathews, and signifying "bad speakers")
 Wakoora
 Wakura
 Wun-yurika

Source:

Some words

 amoo. ('mother')
 beeroo-beeroo. ('white man')
 kia ('tame dog')
 nunchun ('father')

Source:

Notes

Citations

Sources

Aboriginal peoples of Queensland